Seán Brady or similar names may refer to:
Seán Brady (bishop) (born 1939), Irish cardinal and former archbishop of Armagh
Sean Brady (fighter) (born 1992), American mixed martial artist
Seán Brady (Irish politician) (1890–1969), Fianna Fáil politician, member of Dáil Éireann
Seán Brady (Irish senator) (1890–1969), Fianna Fáil politician, member of Seanad Éireann
Shaun Brady (active 2003–2008), British trade union leader, ASLEF general secretary
Shawn Brady, fictional character on the America soap opera Days of Our Lives
Seán Ó Brádaigh (born 1937), Irish republican activist

See also 
 John Brady (disambiguation), the English equivalent